Arbanitis villosus is a species of armoured trap-door spider in the family Idiopidae, and is endemic to New South Wales. 

It was first described by William Joseph Rainbow in 1914 as Megalosara villosa. In 2006, Graham Wishart transferred it to the genus, Misgolas.  In 2017, Michael Rix and others transferred it to the genus, Arbanitis.

References

Idiopidae
Spiders described in 1914
Spiders of Australia
Fauna of New South Wales
Taxa named by William Joseph Rainbow